Keret House is a structure and art installation in Warsaw, Poland. The two-story art installation was named after Israeli writer and filmmaker Etgar Keret, who was the building's first tenant.

Building

The iron structure contains two floors, and has one bedroom, a kitchen, a bathroom and a living area. It has two non-opening windows, with sunlight also entering through translucent glass panels that make up the walls. The entire interior is painted white and the building's electricity is obtained from a neighboring building. The house has custom water and sewage technology and is not connected to the city-provided water systems.  Because of its small size, the building only accommodates a small 2-beverage refrigerator, and occupants use a ladder to travel from level to level. Entry is via retractable stairs that, when closed, become the living area.

The construction of the Keret House supported by the Warsaw Town Hall and was produced and realised by the Polish Modern Art Foundation. The house is classified as an "art installation" because it does not meet Polish building codes, even though it is being used as a residence.

In 2019, it was named as one of the most iconic houses in the world and included on a list of international projects honoured by the architecture portal Iconic Houses.

Location
Keret House is located between 22 Chłodna Street and 74 Żelazna Street in Warsaw, and is designated as the narrowest house in the world. The structure was installed between a pre-war house and an apartment building. Keret said that staying at the Keret House is like a "memorial to my family"; his parents' families died in World War II when Nazi Germany occupied Poland.

References

External links

 Inside the Keret House (fr)
 Keret House website
Keret House in Warsaw - Video 
Keret House opening in Warsaw - Image Gallery
Keret House Is a Finalist of the Architizer A+ Awards

Buildings and structures in Warsaw
Houses completed in 2012
Wola